is a Japanese actor and singer who has appeared in more than 80 films since 1982. He serves as head representative of Headrock Inc.

Career
Toyohara graduated from Nakano High School (part-time). He began appearing on television in his teenage years but primarily established himself as an actor through V-cinema. He later appeared in Junji Sakamoto's films, such as Aegis and Chameleon. In 2007, he won the Best Actor Award at the 5th Monaco International Film Festival for Cinderella Formula. In 2012, he starred in the film A Gentle Rain Falls for Fukushima. In 2017, he planned, wrote, directed and starred in his first stage production of the theatrical comedy Meijin Chōji. In February 2018, he went public with his affair with Kyōko Koizumi, with whom he had been working closely for a long time, despite being married and with children.

Selected filmography

Films

Television

References

External links
 HEADROCK website
 Kōsuke Toyohara on NHK Archives
 
 

1965 births
Living people
Male actors from Tokyo
Japanese male film actors
Japanese male television actors